Ulothrix speciosa is a small green marine alga.

Description
This small green alga grows to no more than 12 cm long.

References

Ulotrichaceae